Robam Neary Chea Chuor is a traditional Khmer dance of young Cambodian women wearing colorful and elegant costumes. The dance reminds the Khmer people of the rich culture that has been nourished through generations, and it is well known among the neighboring countries of South-East Asia.

External links
Types of Khmer dance
 VDO clip of Neary Chea Chuor

Cambodian dances